The 2011–12 Ethiopian Premier League is the season of the Ethiopian Premier League since its establishment in 1944. A total of 14 teams are contesting the league.

Clubs 

Adama City FC
Air Force FC
Arba Minch City FC
Awassa City FC
CBE SA (Addis Abeba)
Dedebit (Addis Abeba)
Defence (Addis Abeba)
Dire Dawa City
EEPCO (Addis Abeba)
Ethiopian Coffee (Addis Abeba)
Harrar Beer Botling FC
Muger Cement (Oromiya)
Saint-George SA (Addis Abeba)
Sidama Coffee (Awassa)

League table

External links
www.khanua.jimdo.com
www.ethiofootball.com
Ethiosports

Premier League
Premier League
Ethiopian Premier League
Ethiopian Premier League